Rigoberto Gómez Laínez (born January 9, 1977) is a retired Honduran football midfielder who last played for Comunicaciones of the Guatemala's top division.

Club career
The rather short Gómez started playing for Comunicaciones in 1996 and has not featured for any other team since, making him one of their most loyal and experienced players As of June 2014, Gómez signed for another season for Comunicaciones.

International career
Although born in neighbouring Honduras, Gómez made his debut for Guatemala at the November 1998 Hurricane Relief Tournament in Los Angeles against Honduras and has, as of January 2010, earned a total of 15 caps, scoring 1 goal. He has represented his country in 2 FIFA World Cup qualification matches  and at the 2000, 2005 and 2007 CONCACAF Gold Cup Finals.

International goals
Scores and results list. Guatemala's goal tally first.

External links
 Player profile - Comunicaciones

References

1977 births
Living people
Sportspeople from Tegucigalpa
Guatemalan footballers
Guatemala international footballers
Comunicaciones F.C. players
2000 CONCACAF Gold Cup players
2005 CONCACAF Gold Cup players
2007 CONCACAF Gold Cup players
Guatemalan people of Honduran descent
Association football midfielders